In aviation, V-speeds are standard terms used to define airspeeds important or useful to the operation of all aircraft. These speeds are derived from data obtained by aircraft designers and manufacturers during flight testing for aircraft type-certification. Using them is considered a best practice to maximize aviation safety, aircraft performance, or both.

The actual speeds represented by these designators are specific to a particular model of aircraft. They are expressed by the aircraft's indicated airspeed (and not by, for example, the ground speed), so that pilots may use them directly, without having to apply correction factors, as aircraft instruments also show indicated airspeed.

In general aviation aircraft, the most commonly used and most safety-critical airspeeds are displayed as color-coded arcs and lines located on the face of an aircraft's airspeed indicator.  The lower ends of the white arc and the green arc are the stalling speed with wing flaps in landing configuration, and stalling speed with wing flaps retracted, respectively.  These are the stalling speeds for the aircraft at its maximum weight. The yellow band is the range in which the aircraft may be operated in smooth air, and then only with caution to avoid abrupt control movement.  The red line is the VNE, the never-exceed speed.

Proper display of V-speeds is an airworthiness requirement for type-certificated aircraft in most countries.

Regulations

The most common V-speeds are often defined by a particular government's aviation regulations. In the United States, these are defined in title 14 of the United States Code of Federal Regulations, known as the Federal Aviation Regulations (FARs). In Canada, the regulatory body, Transport Canada, defines 26 commonly used V-speeds in their Aeronautical Information Manual. V-speed definitions in FAR 23, 25 and equivalent are for designing and certification of airplanes, not for their operational use. The descriptions below are for use by pilots.

Regulatory V-speeds
These V-speeds are defined by regulations. They are typically defined with constraints such as weight, configuration, or phases of flight. Some of these constraints have been omitted to simplify the description.

Other V-speeds
Some of these V-speeds are specific to particular types of aircraft and are not defined by regulations.

Mach numbers
Whenever a limiting speed is expressed by a Mach number, it is expressed relative to the local speed of sound, e.g. VMO: Maximum operating speed, MMO: Maximum operating Mach number.

V1 definitions
V1 is the critical engine failure recognition speed or takeoff decision speed. It is the speed above which the takeoff will continue even if an engine fails or another problem occurs, such as a blown tire. The speed will vary among aircraft types and varies according to factors such as aircraft weight, runway length, wing flap setting, engine thrust used and runway surface contamination, thus it must be determined by the pilot before takeoff. Aborting a takeoff after V1 is strongly discouraged because the aircraft may not be able to stop before the end of the runway, thus suffering a runway overrun.

V1 is defined differently in different jurisdictions, and definitions change over time as aircraft regulations are amended.

The US Federal Aviation Administration defines it as: "the maximum speed in the takeoff at which the pilot must take the first action (e.g., apply brakes, reduce thrust, deploy speed brakes) to stop the airplane within the accelerate-stop distance. V1 also means the minimum speed in the takeoff, following a failure of the critical engine at VEF, at which the pilot can continue the takeoff and achieve the required height above the takeoff surface within the takeoff distance." V1 thus includes reaction time. In addition to this reaction time, a safety margin equivalent to 2 seconds at V1 is added to the accelerate-stop distance.
Transport Canada defines it as: "Critical engine failure recognition speed" and adds: "This definition is not restrictive. An operator may adopt any other definition outlined in the aircraft flight manual (AFM) of TC type-approved aircraft as long as such definition does not compromise operational safety of the aircraft."

See also 
 ICAO recommendations on use of the International System of Units
 Balanced field takeoff

Notes

References

Further reading 
 

Airspeed
Aircraft performance